Donahey is a surname. Notable people called Donahey include:

A. Victor Donahey (1873–1946), Democratic Party politician from Ohio, U.S.A.
E. D. Donahey (born 1962), professional name of American journalist and CNN news presenter E. D. Hill 
Gertrude Walton Donahey (1908–2004), American Democratic politician, Ohio State Treasurer
John W. Donahey (1905–1967), American Democratic politician, 53rd Lieutenant Governor of Ohio
Mary Dickerson Donahey (1876–1962), American author of children's books and cookbooks
William Donahey (1883–1970), U.S. cartoonist and creator of The Teenie Weenies

See also
Donaghey